Bubble Man (Katakana: バブルマン サントリー), is a popular Japanese soft drink which is owned by the Suntory Group. Bubble Man features an anime-style character on the front similar to other sentai characters such as Zyuranger. Bubble Man can be purchased in Japan from jidōhanbaiki (Japanese vending machines). Controversial advertisements for Bubbleman have raised issues, due to the actions of one character on a TV commercial.

Varieties
BUBBLEMAN
Grape flash (2005 April) 
Orange cross (2005 April) 
Soda jet (2005 July)
Fruit Bonn bar (2005 September)
Golden delicious (2005 November) 
Soda fever (2006 November)

BUBBLEMAN II 
Soda planet (2006 April) 
Bubble rocket taste (2006 May) 
The south pole soda (2006 July) 
Lightning soda (2006 September)

Soft drinks